Tumatumari is a community in the Potaro-Siparuni Region of Guyana, located some 15 km upstream of the confluence of the Potaro and Essequibo Rivers.

It was initially an Amerindian settlement of Arawak tribebut is now a mixture of different race groups similar to that of Mahdia. The area was believed to be rich in gold and diamonds and mining was the main economic activity for several years.

The fertile agricultural land in the area resulted in the establishment of a Guyana National Service (GNS) centre in the area in 1975. The centre concentrated on training young people to develop agricultural and technical skills. Several agro-based industries were established at Tumatumari during the tenure of the GNS. These industries included a pencil factory, a match factory and a tooth-pick factory. Power for the industries was provided by the Tumatumari hydro-electric power station which was established in 1957.

People were not allowed to live around the GNS Centre. The availability of electricity resulted in the establishment of several villages around the area. The Amerindians settled in El Paso, Micobie and Tumatumari Landing became a little hamlet. The total population grew to approximately 450 and electrical appliances were purchased for several homes. The hydro-power station ceased operations in the late 1980s, and the factories and industries consequently ceased operations. A number of the residents moved from the area. The area is now totally dependent on mining. The current population as of 2012 is 86 persons.

References

Populated places in Potaro-Siparuni